Lezama Partido is a partido of Buenos Aires Province in Argentina. It was established in 2009. It has a population of about 4,000.

External links

 
 Lezama news at Infozona.com.ar

States and territories established in 2009
Partidos of Buenos Aires Province
2009 establishments in Argentina